Cathie Pilkington  (born 31 July 1968) is a London-based British sculptor represented by Karsten Schubert London. She studied at Edinburgh College of Art and the Royal College of Art, and was elected as a Royal Academician in 2014. She became professor of sculpture at the Royal Academy Schools in 2016.

Early life and education 
Pilkington was born in Manchester, England. She attended the art foundation course at North Cheshire College in Warrington (now part of the University of Chester), then went on to study silversmithing at Edinburgh College of Art from 1986. She graduated with a BA in 1991, with first-class honours, and in the same year was awarded the first John Watson Prize for Art. She also taught in America and India in 1989–1990. She exhibited with the Bruton Gallery in Bath from 1992, and was part of the first Royal West of England Academy Open Sculpture Exhibition in 1993. Pilkington studied at the Royal College of Art in London from 1995, gaining an MA in sculpture in 1997; she was subsequently awarded the Cheltenham Fine Art Fellowship.

Career 
In 1999, Pilkington's sculpture Bill and Bob, depicting two Jack Russell terriers swimming in a pool, was installed in Millennium Square in Bristol. This was Pilkington's first commission for a public space, The two dogs are rendered in painted bronze and set in a pool of vivid blue rubber, flush with the square's paving.

Pilkington's "amusing and ambiguously sentimental sculptures" were included in the three-person show Off the Leash at the Graves Art Gallery in Sheffield in 2003, the same year that her Homunculus (2003), a miniature painted fibreglass manikin of a boy, was displayed outside the headquarters of The Economist magazine in London. At the time she was based in London as a lecturer at Camberwell College of Arts. In 2012, her solo exhibition entitled The Value of the Paw was held at the V&A Museum of Childhood in Bethnal Green, London.

Pilkington was elected as a Royal Academician in 2014, and was awarded the Sunny Dupree award for her work Reclining Doll (2013) Referencing the reclining figures of Henry Moore, Pilkington's interest in using shop windows and modes of display, and in using dolls and manikins in her work, is evident here: as she says, "The doll is a perfect object to put lots of ideas into" . In 2017, after being appointed Professor of Sculpture at the Royal Academy Schools, Pilkington created the project Anatomy of a Doll, in which she placed ballet-dancer figures, derived from those in the work of Edgar Degas, distorted and apparently in the process of being sculpted, in the Life Room of the Royal Academy Schools. her Surrealist approach to the figure was shared with participants in the project 'Exquisite Corpse' which she invited members of the public to attend classes based on the work.She says of her engagement with the female form: 'I am consciously joining in with the objectification of the female form, but on my own terms, and with glee'

For the Brighton Festival in 2017 Pilkington created Life Rooms and engaged with the work of British artist Eric Gill, co-curating the exhibition Eric Gill: The Body, with Cathie Pilkington which featured work by Gill and her own work, Doll for Petra, inspired by a doll made by Gill for his daughter, at Ditchling Museum of Art and Craft, Sussex.

Pilkington chose a doll as the personal item to be included in a portrait drawn from life by fellow Royal Academician Eileen Cooper in 2019; which has since been acquiring by the National Portrait Gallery.

Pilkington's work is held in the collections of the Deste Foundation in Athens, Manchester Art Gallery and the David Roberts Collection in London.

Exhibitions

Solo 
 2021    Estin Thalassa, Karsten Schubert, London
 2019    Working From Home, Pallant House Gallery, Chichester
 2017    Life Room: Anatomy of a Doll, Royal Academy Schools, London
 2017    The Life Rooms, Brighton University Gallery, lead visual artist at Brighton Festival
 2017    Doll for Petra, Ditchling Museum of Art & Craft, Ditchling
 2014    Thing-Soul, Marlborough Fine Art, London
 2012    The Value of the Paw, V&A Museum of Childhood, Bethnal Green, London
 2010    Peaceable Kingdom, Marlborough Fine Art, London
 2009    Toby Jugs and other works, Space Station 65, London
 2007    White Elephant, Marlborough Fine Art, London
 2005    Garden, Program, London
 2004    I’m a Winner! The Apartment, Athens
 2004    Curio, Space Station 65, London
 2003    Homunculus, The Economist Plaza, London
 2000    Short Stories, Galway Arts Centre, Ireland
 1998    Viva Chihuahua! Prema, Uley, Gloucestershire
 1991    John Watson Prize, Gallery of Modern Art, Edinburgh

Group 

 2015    Thirteen Blackbirds Looked at a Man, Chapter Arts Centre, Cardiff
 2012    Never Promised Pound Land, No Format Gallery, Woolwich, London
 2010    Bedizzened,  APT London
 2008    That’s Entertainment, Whitstable Biennale, Kent
 2008    Arque Chiado, Lisbon, Portugal
 2007    The Craft, Transition Gallery, London
 2006    The Craft, The Metropole Gallery, Folkestone
 2005    Engerland! OneOtwo, The Tea Buildings, London
 2003    Emporium, Domo Baal, London
 2003    Off the Leash, Graves Art Gallery, Sheffield
 2001    For the Love of Dog, Battersea Pumphouse Gallery
 2001    Auras and Avatars, The First Public School, Hydra, Greece
 1999    Rover, Manchester City Art Gallery
 1999    Medway Open, Rochester Art Gallery
 1998    False Economy, Gasworks. London
 1998    Viva Chihuahua! The Tannery, London

Awards 

 2014    Elected Royal Academician, [[Royal Academy of Arts, London
 2016    Appointed Professor of Sculpture, [[Royal Academy Schools, London
 2014    Sunny Dupree Award, Royal Academy of Art, London
 1997    Fine Art Fellowship, Cheltenham

References

External links 
 

1968 births
Living people
Alumni of the Royal College of Art
Alumni of the Edinburgh College of Art
Artists from Manchester
British sculptors
People from Northwich
Royal Academicians